Bulldog Drummond's Secret Police is a 1939 English Castle murder mystery film directed by James P. Hogan, based on the H. C. McNeile novel Temple Tower. It is one of many films featuring the British sleuth and adventurer Bulldog Drummond. In 1930, Fox produced Temple Tower, directed by Donald Gallaher and starring Kenneth MacKenna and Marceline Day, which was also based on the McNeile book.

The story is set 28 miles outside London in Rockingham, as a sign on the railroad station states.

Plot
An absent-minded Professor Downie (Forrester Harvey) makes a call upon Capt. Hugh "Bulldog" Drummond (John Howard) as he is making plans for his much-delayed wedding to fiancée Phyllis Claverling (Heather Angel) in his ancestral home Temple Tower.

The professor informs Drummond that a fortune was buried in one of the walled off storerooms underneath his estate, and that Downie was in possession of a book written in code that would lead them to discover the treasure. Unfortunately for the professor, someone else also wanted the riches and Drummond once again is dragged into the plot as the code book is stolen, Professor Downie is murdered, and Phyllis is kidnapped.

Cast
 Heather Angel as Phyllis Clavering 
 John Howard as Captain Hugh C. "Bulldog" Drummond
 H.B. Warner as Colonel Nielson
 Reginald Denny as Algy Longworth
 E.E. Clive as Tenny
 Elizabeth Patterson as Aunt Blanche
 Leo G. Carroll as Henry Seaton/Andrew Boulton
 Forrester Harvey as Professor Downie
 Clyde Cook as Constable Hawkins
 David Clyde as Constable Jenkins
 Neil Fitzgerald as Station Master
 Elspeth Dudgeon as Housekeeper
 Louise Campbell as Woman in Drummond's Dream (uncredited)

Notes
The film uses flashbacks from previous Drummond films and dream sequences extensively, which has led some to criticize it as tiresome. Oddly, despite the phrase "secret police" in the title, there is nothing relating to any secret police in the plot except Col. Neilsen's quip when several of the characters are together. The production values are high as the sets are of high quality, but the script has not received much acclaim.

References

External links 
 
 
 
 
 

Films based on Bulldog Drummond
1939 films
1930s English-language films
American mystery thriller films
American black-and-white films
Films directed by James Patrick Hogan
Films based on mystery novels
1930s mystery thriller films
Paramount Pictures films
1930s American films